The Church of Saint-Jean de Montierneuf is a Roman Catholic church in Poitiers, France.

The church was built in the 11th century and is notable for its Romanesque architecture.

It has been listed as a Monument historique since 1840.

]

See also
 History of medieval Arabic and Western European domes

References

Notes

Roman Catholic churches in Poitiers
Monuments historiques of Vienne